is a Japanese manga artist.

He is known for his love of automobiles and motorcycles, and several of his series and their characters reflect this, such as in éX-Driver and Oh My Goddess!.

Early life and career
Born in Chiba, Japan, he first came to public attention as an editor of Puff magazine, his first job after completing high school. Fujishima originally intended to be a draftsman, but took the editorial role after failing to get a drafting apprenticeship. He later became assistant to manga artist Tatsuya Egawa in the production of the Making Be Free! manga, and in 1986 began his first original manga series You're Under Arrest.  His second manga series Oh My Goddess!, also translated as Ah! My Goddess, is Fujishima's most famous work, which made him a household name in Japan. He is also well known as the character designer for several games in the Tales series and Sakura Wars.

Personal life
On June 29, 2016, the famous 20-year-old cosplayer Nekomu Otogi announced her marriage to Fujishima as well as her pregnancy on her Twitter page. Both of them had known each other on Twitter approximately since 2014.

On July 7, 2016, Fujishima confirmed the marriage on his Twitter account.

Works

References

 "Ah! Megami-sama: Tatakau Tsubasa". Newtype USA 6 (12) 15. December 2007. .
 Nakagami, Yoshikatsu et al. "You're Under Arrest: Full Throttle". Newtype USA 6 (12) 48–49. December 2007. .

External links
 

 
1964 births
Living people
Anime character designers
People from Chiba (city)
Manga artists from Chiba Prefecture